The 1957 Monaco Grand Prix was a Formula One motor race held on 19 May 1957 at Monaco. It was race 2 of 8 in the 1957 World Championship of Drivers.

Race report 

Despite a hesitant start, Moss led away on the first lap from Collins, Fangio, and Hawthorn. On lap 4 coming out of the tunnel, there was mayhem. Moss went straight through the chicane, sending debris from the wrecked barrier crashing onto the circuit. Collins crashed through the quayside barriers trying to avoid it. Fangio and Brooks slowed to make their way through the carnage. Brooks' effort was for nought, being hit by Mike Hawthorn's Ferrari, which lost a wheel. Fangio took the lead from Brooks' damaged car and held it to the chequered flag.

On lap 96, with nine laps to go, von Trips lost a certain third place when his engine blew up. Brabham inherited it, but he in turn lost the place when the engine in his Cooper T43-Climax cut out at Casino five laps from the end. He coasted to the harbour and pushed the car home for 6th place.

Classification

Qualifying

Race

Notes
 – Includes 1 point for fastest lap

Shared drives
 Car #24: Wolfgang von Trips (92 laps) and Mike Hawthorn (3 laps).
 Car #34: Giorgio Scarlatti (42 laps) and Harry Schell (22 laps).

Championship standings after the race 
Drivers' Championship standings

Note: Only the top five positions are included.

References

External links
Kettlewell, Mike. "Monaco: Road Racing on the Riviera", in Northey, Tom, editor. World of Automobiles, Volume 12, pp. 1381–4. London: Orbis, 1974.

Monaco Grand Prix
Monaco Grand Prix
Grand Prix
Monaco Grand Prix